The Namaqua girdled lizard (Namazonurus namaquensis) is a species of lizard in the family Cordylidae. It is a small, spiny lizard found in Namibia and South Africa.

References

Namazonurus
Reptiles of Namibia
Reptiles described in 1914
Taxa named by Paul Ayshford Methuen
Taxa named by John Hewitt (herpetologist)